Xavier Gachet (born 31 October 1989) is a French ski mountaineer.

Gachet attended the Lycée René Perrin in Ugine.

Selected results 
 2010:
 3rd (espoirs), Trophée des Gastlosen (ISMF World Cup), together with Sébastien Perrier
 2011:
 3rd, World Championship, relay, together with Didier Blanc, Yannick Buffet and William Bon Mardion
 4th, World Championship, sprint
2013:
 3rd, World Championship, Team Race, together with Alexis Sévennec-Verdier
 3rd, World Championship,  Relay, together with Alexis Sévennec-Verdier, Mathéo Jacquemoud and William Bon Mardion
2015:
 4ème en individuel, 2015 Championnat du Monde de ski alpinisme de Verbier, 
 Vice Champion du Monde par équipe, 2015 Championnat du Monde de ski alpinisme de Verbier, Team Race, avec William Bon-mardion
 Vice Champion du Monde de relais, 2015 Championnat du Monde de ski alpinisme de Verbier,  Relais, avec Alexis Sévennec, Didier blanc and William Bon Mardion

Pierra Menta 

 2011: 10th, together with Alexis Sévennec-Verdier
 2012: 5th, together with Mathéo Jacquemoud
 2013: 5th, together with Florent Perrier
 2014: 3rd, together with Valentin Favre

Trofeo Mezzalama 

 6th, together with Grégory Gachet and Alexis Sévennec-Verdier
 5th, together with Alexis Sévennec-Verdier and Davide Galizzi

External links 
 Xavier Gachet at skimountaineering.org

References 

1989 births
Living people
Sportspeople from Albertville
French male ski mountaineers
French sky runners
21st-century French people